Durgabai Kamat (c. 1879 – 17 May 1997) was a Marathi actress, who was the first actress in Indian cinema.

Early and personal life
Kamat was born in a brahmin family. She was also the maternal grandmother of veteran Marathi actor Chandrakant Gokhale, and the great-grandmother of actors Vikram Gokhale and Mohan Gokhale.

Career
In the early 1900s, acting in film or theatre was a taboo for women, so much so Dadasaheb Phalke, the father of Indian cinema, had to use male actors for female roles in first Indian film, Raja Harishchandra. However with its success, female actresses were encouraged. Thus he introduced Kamat in his 1913 second movie Mohini Bhasmasur  as a leading lady Parvati, while her daughter Kamlabai Gokhale, played the role of Mohini, thus becoming the first female child actress of Indian cinema. After Kamat, other actresses started working in cinema.

Death
Kamat died on 17 May 1997, in Pune, Maharashtra, at the age of 117.

Filmography

References

Actresses from Pune
1870s births
1997 deaths
Place of birth missing
Indian silent film actresses
20th-century Indian actresses
Marathi actresses
Actresses in British India